Kalahasti Mahatyam is a 1954 Indian Telugu-language film directed by H. L. N. Simha starring Dr. Rajkumar. This is the only non-Kannada film starring Dr. Rajkumar.

It is a musical hit film with some melodious Bhakti songs written by Tholeti Venkata Reddy. The music score is provided by R. Sudarshanam and R. Goverdhanam as Associate. They are beautifully sung by Ghantasala Venkateswara Rao, M. L. Vasantha Kumari, A.M. Raja and P. Susheela.

The film is a remake of the 1954 Kannada film Bedara Kannappa which also starred Rajkumar in the lead role. This film was successful in Andhra Pradesh and screened more than 100 days.

Plot 
The story is that of Kannappa Nayanar, a noted Shiva Bhakta.

Cast

Soundtrack 

 Ashale... Vidhi Vratale Eduraye - 
 Chemma Chekka Ladadam - Singers: A.M Raja, P. Susheela
 Jaya Jaya Mahadeva (Singer: Ghantasala)
 Madhuram Shiva Mantram Madilo Maruvake O Manasa (Lyrics: Tholeti; Singer: Ghantasala)
 Mahesa Papavinasa Kailasa Vasa Eesa (Lyrics: Tholeti; Singer: Ghantasala Venkateswara Rao)
 Mayajalamuna Munigevu Naruda -
 Shri Kalahastiswara Swamy Jejelivi Gonuma - 
 Shri Parvathi Devi Chekove Shailakumari (Lyrics: Tholeti; Singer: P. Susheela)

See also 
 Kalahasti temple
 Bedara Kannappa 1954 Kannada film.
 Bhakta Kannappa 1976 Telugu film.

References

External links 
 Sri Kalahastiswara Mahatyam at IMDb.

1954 films
1950s Telugu-language films
Indian black-and-white films
Hindu devotional films
Telugu remakes of Kannada films
Films scored by R. Sudarsanam
Films directed by H. L. N. Simha
Indian biographical drama films
1950s biographical drama films